Les Farnum is an American politician serving as a member of the Louisiana House of Representatives from the 33rd district. Elected in November 2019, he assumed office on January 13, 2020.

Early life and education 
Farnum was born in Sulphur, Louisiana. He graduated from the Sowela Technical Community College.

Career 
Farnum was a union electrician. He then worked as an energy consultant for Power and Control Systems in Baton Rouge, Louisiana. He was a power systems supervisor at Phillips 66 from 2008 to 2013. He was also a manager at Sasol. Farnum was an unsuccessful candidate for the Louisiana House of Representatives in 2018, losing to incumbent Republican Stuart Moss. Farnum defeated Moss in a rematch election in 2019 and assumed office in January 2020.

References 

Living people
People from Sulphur, Louisiana
People from Calcasieu Parish, Louisiana
Republican Party members of the Louisiana House of Representatives
Year of birth missing (living people)